Azad is a village in the municipality of Dəyirmanlar in the Goranboy Rayon of Azerbaijan.

References

Populated places in Goranboy District